Major-General Wilfrid Edward Bownas Smith  (March 1867 – May 1942) was a senior British Army officer.

Military career

Smith transferred from the Militia into the South Wales Borderers on 9 May 1888. He saw action with the British expedition to Tibet in 1903 and then became a brigade major in India in 1905 and a Deputy Assistant Adjutant General in India in 1908. He went on to be commanding officer of the 1st Battalion the Lincolnshire Regiment in 1914 and was deployed to France with the British Expeditionary Force at the start of the First World War. He became General Officer Commanding 52nd (Lowland) Infantry Division in Egypt in June 1916 and saw action with the Egyptian Expeditionary Force in the Middle Eastern theatre before retiring in September 1917.

References

1867 births
1942 deaths
Companions of the Order of the Bath
Companions of the Order of St Michael and St George
South Wales Borderers officers
Military personnel from London
British Army generals of World War I
British Army major generals
British Militia officers